Hiroko Kurihara is an American Oakland California-based designer and activist recognized for her role in the Oakland Art Murmur Movement, as a founder of the 25th Street Collective, and as a board member of the Oakland Asian Cultural Center. She is a graduate of Brown University and the Rhode Island School of Design.

References

American designers
Activists from California
Brown University alumni
Rhode Island School of Design alumni
Living people
Year of birth missing (living people)